Māris Rozentāls (born 29 October 1974) is a Latvian bobsledder. He competed at the 1998 Winter Olympics and the 2002 Winter Olympics.

References

External links
 

1974 births
Living people
Latvian male bobsledders
Olympic bobsledders of Latvia
Bobsledders at the 1998 Winter Olympics
Bobsledders at the 2002 Winter Olympics